Abbotts is an abandoned town in Western Australia located in the Murchison Goldfields region of Western Australia and  north-west of Meekatharra on the MeekatharraMount Clere Road.

The townsite was initially established in 1898 and gazetted in 1900, and is named after a prospector named Vincent Vrauizan who had changed his name to Vincent Abbott in 1893.

One of the earliest mines to open was the Black Iguana. In 1895 the Black Iguana and the Abbotts mine were both operating ten head stamp mills in the town for processing ore.

In 1902, all of the boarders at Abbott's Hotel were poisoned by eating tinned beetroot; many of the victims were given emetics, which were administered "with much success". No fatalities were recorded from the incident.

The townsite is one of many ghost towns in the area; others include Peak Hill, Gabanintha, Horseshoe and Garden Gully.

References 

Ghost towns in the Mid West of Western Australia
Shire of Meekatharra